General McCook may refer to:

Alexander McDowell McCook (1831–1903), Union Army major general
Daniel McCook Jr. (1834–1864), Union Army brigadier general
Edward M. McCook (1833–1909), Union Army brigadier general and brevet major general
Robert Latimer McCook (1827–1862), Union Army brigadier general